Xiashuijing station is a metro station on Line 5 of the Shenzhen Metro. It opened on 22 June 2011. This station is located under Jihua Road.

Station layout

Exits

References

External links
 Shenzhen Metro Xiashuijing Station (Chinese)
 Shenzhen Metro Xiashuijing Station (English)

Shenzhen Metro stations
Railway stations in Guangdong
Longgang District, Shenzhen
Railway stations in China opened in 2011